William Alexander Gadsby (August 8, 1927 – March 10, 2016) was a  Canadian professional ice hockey defenceman who played for the Chicago Black Hawks, New York Rangers, and Detroit Red Wings in the National Hockey League between 1946 and 1966.

Playing career
Gadsby began his outstanding hockey career in Calgary playing for several minor league teams including the Alberta Midget champions in 1942. He played two years for the Edmonton Junior Canadians before joining the Chicago Black Hawks in 1946. He was captain twice during his eight years with them. Gadsby contracted polio in 1952 but fought back without interrupting his hockey career, although he spent three weeks in the hospital. That was not his first brush with danger, however—in 1939 he was travelling with his mother on the passenger liner  when it was hit by a torpedo fired by a German U-boat and sank, and he and his mother spent several hours in a lifeboat before being rescued.

Gadsby was a First Team All-Star three times and a Second Team All-Star four times. In 1958–59, he set a record for assists by a defenceman, with 46.

Despite a long (20 seasons) NHL hockey career, Gadsby never won the Stanley Cup. He came closest to winning the Cup in 1964, when the Detroit Red Wings lost a seven-game final series to the Toronto Maple Leafs.

When he retired he was the leading career scorer among defencemen with 568 points.

Bill Gadsby was inducted to the Alberta Sports Hall of Fame in 1986 as an athlete.

Gadsby was inducted into the Hockey Hall of Fame in 1970.  In 1998, he was ranked number 99 on [[List of 100 greatest hockey players by The Hockey News|The Hockey News''' list of the 100 Greatest Hockey Players]]. In the 2009 book 100 Ranger Greats'', the authors ranked Gadsby at No. 63 all-time of the 901 New York Rangers who had played during the team's first 82 seasons.

Retirement and death
Gadsby was an "Honored Member" of the Detroit Red Wings Alumni Association, and was active in its efforts to raise money for children's charities in Metro Detroit.

He died at the age of 88 on March 10, 2016, in Farmington Hills, Michigan, following a period of failing health.

Career statistics

Regular season and playoffs

NHL coaching record

See also
List of NHL players with 1000 games played

References

External links

1927 births
2016 deaths
Alberta Sports Hall of Fame inductees
Canadian ice hockey coaches
Canadian ice hockey defencemen
Chicago Blackhawks captains
Chicago Blackhawks players
Detroit Red Wings coaches
Detroit Red Wings players
Edmonton Oil Kings (WCHL) coaches
Hockey Hall of Fame inductees
New York Rangers players
Ice hockey people from Calgary